Microselia is a genus of flies in the family Phoridae.

Species
M. beaveri Disney, 1983
M. cuspidata Beyer, 1965
M. daccordii Gori, 1999
M. deemingi Disney, 1983
M. espanaensis Disney, 2006
M. forsiusi (Schmitz, 1927)
M. micropila Carles-Tolrá, 2006
M. rivierae Schmitz, 1934
M. southwoodi Disney, 1988
M. texana Disney, 1982
M. yemenensis Disney, 2006

References

Phoridae
Platypezoidea genera